Supinfogame is the first French school fully dedicated to the videogame industry. Located in Valenciennes, it is one of the three schools of Rubika, with Supinfocom and International School of Design.  Based on a chamber of commerce initiative and launched in 2001, Supinfogame trains students in game design, game art, management and game programming.

Each year, 40 baccalaureate laureates pass the test to start the 3-year first Cycle, in Management/Game Design or Management/Game Art Section. The second cycle is open to candidates with an HND level (equivalent to a Bac+2 or Bac+3). The number of students in the Second cycle is 25 places for Management/Game Design, 20 places for Management/Game Art and 16 for Management/Programming.

The diploma delivered is recognized by the French Government and its title is : Videogame Director. It is a Bac+5 diploma. The school is also supported by the SELL, the SNJV and by the European Union as part of ESF and ERDF.

Supinfogame and the videogame industry 

Since its beginning, Supinfogame has built its educational content with the help of professionals. 
In France and abroad, videogame companies (both developers and publishers) trust SUPINFOGAME's pedagogy and therefore offer internships and positions to students in France and worldwide (Ubisoft, 2K Czech, Arkane Studios, Electronic Arts, Gameloft, Eden Games, Ankama).

Thus, many students and graduates appear in the credits of significant published games like: Dishonored, Assassin's Creed, Crysis 2, Tom Clancy's Ghost Recon: Future Soldier, Far Cry 3, Splinter Cell Double Agent, Rayman Raving Rabbids, Star Wars: Lethal Alliance and so on.

Awards  

 In 2011 : SACD AWARDS for Best Student Game for Hollywood Zombie Pinball Apocalypse
 In 2011 : MICROSOFT, IMAGINE CUP: World Gold Medal for Game Design on Mobile for Brainergy
 In 2010 : UNITY AWARDS for Best Visual Design for the Uncanny Fish Hunt.
 In 2009 : IMAGINA AWARDS for Alice en Pièces.

International partnerships 

In 2007 a MoU was signed between Supinfogame and the Nanyang Polytechnic of Singapore for student's exchanges.
The same year, the Indian group D.S.Kulkarni call upon SUPINFOCOM GROUP to expand their know-how. In 2008 Supinfogame, Supinfocom and the ISD launched their pedagogy on the international campus of Pune, in India.
20.0% of our 200 alumni work in foreign countries: in the USA (New York City and San Francisco), in Canada (Montreal and Toronto), in China (Shanghai), in Korea (Seoul).

Career prospects 

Supinfogame offers a wide range of careers: game designer, level designer, production assistant, project manager, 2D/3D, 2D/3D animator, character designer, and screenplay writer.

Out of 200 diplomaed students, 98.0% actually work in the Gaming Industry.

External links

 Official Website 
 SupinfocomGROUP Website 
 DSK Supinfogame Official Website 
 Les meilleurs projets des étudiants (Vidéos)

References
 

Engineering universities and colleges in France
Engineering colleges in Pune
Video game universities
Educational institutions established in 2001
2001 establishments in France
Universities in Hauts-de-France
Education in Valenciennes
International schools in India